Azarbaijan Shahid Madani University, (Danushgah-e Shihid-e Midâni-ye Âzerbaijan) commonly called only Azarbaijan University, is a public university located near Tabriz, East Azerbaijan Province, Iran, founded in 1987. The university provides both undergraduate and graduate education to approximately 7,500 students at a wide range of fields including engineering, basic sciences, literature and theology. The university has got Research Gate's total impact point of 1716.47 from 61 publications, according to the latest statistics.

History
Azarbaijan University was founded in 1987 in Tabriz as a branch of Tehran's Tarbiat Moallem (teacher education) University. The initial objective of the university was to train teachers in different area for the fulfillment of Iranian government educational development policies and the major concern of the university was focused on training teachers for high schools and technical schools.

In 1988, Azarbaijan University became an independent university under the title Tabriz University of Tarbiat Moallem and later Azarbaijan University of Tarbiat Moallem. In 2012, due to changing of Iranian educational policies, the university turned to a general educational university under the title Azarbaijan Shahid Madani University. The name "Shahid Madani" comes from an Iranian cleric from Azarshahr who became a martyr in the early years of Islamic Revolution.

Recently, the university is expanding fast and it is planning to be one of the prominent educational and research centers in Iran. New faculty buildings are being opened, new young academic staff are being employed and a lot of academic activities are underway to convert the university to one of the most dynamic universities in northwestern Iran.

Faculties

 Engineering
 Basic Sciences
 Literature and Human Sciences
 Theology and Islamic Sciences
 Information Technology
 Psychology & Educational Sciences
 Agriculture

Campuses
Azarbaijan University has two campuses:

 Main campus is located in the countryside of Tabriz alongside the Tabriz - Maragheh highway, near Azarshahr and Mamaqan, 35 km Southwest of Tabriz. Administrative part, faculties, most of student dormitories, laboratories, workshops and amphitheaters are located in main campus. The campus also has a train station, 3 restaurants, bakery, a health center, and a shopping center.
 Tabriz campus, which is located in Dampezeshki neighborhood of Tabriz, was established in 2013 with a focus on graduate studies in some of the theoretical engineering and science majors. The programs in Tabriz campus include Master of Science in: Analytical Chemistry, Theoretical Physics, Structural Engineering, Electrical Power Engineering, Applied Mathematics and PhD degree programs in: Analytical Chemistry, Atomic and Molecular Physics. Tabriz Campus holds the "Virtual and Distance Learning Center" of the university and also summer and short courses are held in this campus.

International Relations 

Azarbaijan Shahid Madani University has cooperation and exchange programs with several universities and institutes in the Middle East and also in Asia and Europe. Some of them are as follows:

 Kanazawa University in Japan 
 Khazar University in Azerbaijan
 Gebze University in Turkey
 Siirt University in Turkey
 Yüzüncü Yıl University in Turkey 
 BBCA Institute in Italy

Student Communities 

There are various student communities and associations with different academic, athletic or artistic objects:

 Materials Student Association
 Poetry and Literature Association
 Music Association
 Photography and Filming Association
 Red Crescent Association
 Charitable Association
 Engineering Academic Communities
 Literature Academic Communities
 Basic Sciences Academic Communities
 Psychology Academic Community
 Botany Academic Community

Exclusive Train

Thanks to the Tehran - Tabriz railroad which passes through the university, Azarbaijan University is the only university in Iran with a railway station inside and its exclusive train which transports students between Tabriz and the university 4 times every business day. Due to the rising number of students. In morning and afternoon rush hours an older train is also used to increase the capacity.

See also
Higher education in Iran
List of universities in Iran

References

External links
Azarbaijan Shahid Madani University Virtual Tour

 
Educational institutions established in 1987
Public universities
Buildings and structures in Tabriz
1987 establishments in Iran
Buildings and structures in East Azerbaijan Province